William George McCloskey (10 November 1823 – 17 September 1909) was an American Catholic priest, who became the fourth Bishop of Louisville, Kentucky.

Life

Early life
William George McCloskey was born in Brooklyn, New York on November 10, 1823, the youngest of five sons of George and Ellen McCloskey. Two of his older brothers also became priests. His brother John became president of Mount St. Mary's College, Emmitsburg.

He was sent to Mount St. Mary's College, Emmitsburg, Maryland in 1835 and graduated in 1840. In May 1850, he was ordained subdeacon at that seminary by  Samuel Eccleston, Archbishop of Baltimore, and on October 6, 1852, was ordained priest by Bishop John Hughes in St. Patrick's Cathedral, New York. He said his first Mass in the basement of the Church of the Nativity, where his brother George was then pastor, and remained there ten months as assistant. Then, from a desire to live in the seminary cloister, he returned with the consent of his superiors to Mount St. Mary's, where he taught English and later Latin.

In 1857, he succeeded William Henry Elder as director of St. Mary's Seminary, where he taught moral theology and sacred scripture. On December 1, 1859 Pope Pius IX appointed McCloskey the first rector of the American College at Rome, being the unanimous choice of the American bishops. He reached Rome in March 1860. Georgetown University had shortly before conferred on him the degree of Doctor of Divinity. Dr. McCloskey's administration of the American College included the period of the American Civil War. There were serious divisions in the student body.

Bishop of Louisville
He was rector until his promotion to the See of Louisville in May 1868, being consecrated bishop in the chapel of the college on May 24 of that year by Cardinal von Reisach, Archbishop of Munich, Bavaria, assisted by Mons. Xavier de Mérode, minister of Pope Pius IX, and by Monsignor Salvatore Nobili Vitelleschi, Archbishop of Osimo and Cingoli.

He arrived in Louisville, as its bishop, towards the end of summer 1868. He found sixty-four churches and left in his diocese at his death one hundred and sixty-five. He introduced many religious orders into the diocese: the Passionists, the Benedictines, the Fathers of the Resurrection, the Little Sisters of the Poor, the Franciscan Sisters, and the Brothers of Mary.

In 1869, his older brother Rev. George McCloskey, resigned as pastor of the Church of the Nativity in Manhattan, a position he had held for over twenty-years, to go to Louisville and serve as vicar general for his brother. In that same year, Bishop McCloskey was instrumental in bringing the Sisters of Mercy to Louisville in October 1869, where they took over operation of the U.S. Marine Hospital, located in the Portland section.

The growth of the parochial schools was chiefly the product of his zeal. In 1869 he established the diocesan seminary known as Preston Park Seminary. He wrote a life of Mary Magdalen (Louisville, 1900).

Bishop McCloskey was present at the First Vatican Council in 1870. He also attended the Second Plenary Council of Baltimore in 1866, and the Third Plenary Council of Baltimore, in 1884, strongly advocating in the former the cause of the American College at Rome.

Death
McCloskey died on September 17, 1909, at Preston Park Seminary near Louisville. He was buried in a cemetery in Nazareth, Kentucky in Nelson County.

References

Sources
The Record, the diocesan organ of Louisville, files;
Brann, History of the American College at Rome (New York, 1910)

Episcopal succession

1823 births
1909 deaths
20th-century Roman Catholic bishops in the United States
Religious leaders from Louisville, Kentucky
Pontifical North American College rectors
Roman Catholic Archdiocese of Louisville
Georgetown University alumni
Mount St. Mary's University alumni
Catholics from Kentucky
19th-century Roman Catholic bishops in the United States